Shanta Ghosh-Broderius (born 3 January 1975 in Neunkirchen, Saarland) is a retired German sprinter who specialized in the 400 metres.

Achievements

Personal bests
100 metres - 11.46 s (2000)
200 metres - 22.80 s (2000)
400 metres - 51.25 s (2001)

References

1975 births
Living people
German female sprinters
Athletes (track and field) at the 2000 Summer Olympics
Olympic athletes of Germany
German people of Indian descent
German people of Bengali descent
World Athletics Championships medalists
World Athletics Indoor Championships medalists
Olympic female sprinters
Sportspeople from Neunkirchen, Saarland